André Zeller (1 January 1898 – 18 September 1979) was a French Army general. He was one of the four generals (the others being Raoul Salan, Edmond Jouhaud, and Maurice Challe) who organized the Algiers putsch of 1961. For his role, Zeller was sentenced to 15 years in prison by a military court. He was released in 1966, and amnestied by Charles de Gaulle in 1968.

Decorations 
Grand Officer of the Légion d'honneur
Croix de guerre 1914-1918
Croix de guerre 1939-1945
Croix de guerre des Théatres d'Opérations Extérieures
Croix de la Valeur Militaire

Works
Dialogues avec un lieutenant (Eng: Dialogues with a lieutenant) (Editions Plon, 1971)
Dialogues avec un colonel (Eng: Dialogues with a colonel) (Editions Plon, 1972)
Dialogues avec un général (Eng: Dialogues with a general) (Editions des Presses de la Cité, 1974)
Les Hommes de la Commune (Eng: The Men of the Commune) (Librairie Académique Perrin, 1969)
Soldats perdus (Eng: Lost soldiers) (Librairie Académique Perrin, 1977)

References

1898 births
1979 deaths
Military personnel from Besançon
French generals
French military personnel of World War I
French military personnel of World War II
French military personnel of the Algerian War
French prisoners and detainees
Grand Officiers of the Légion d'honneur
Prisoners and detainees of France
Recipients of the Croix de Guerre 1914–1918 (France)
Recipients of the Croix de Guerre 1939–1945 (France)
Recipients of the Croix de guerre des théâtres d'opérations extérieures
Recipients of the Cross for Military Valour